Charles Denton Abel was born in London in 1831, the grandson of August Christian Andreas Abel, who was court miniature painter to the Grand Duke of Mecklenburgh Schwerin. and the younger brother of the chemist and explosives expert, Sir Frederick Abel, Chairman and Albert Medallist of the Society of Arts.

In 1856 he entered into partnership with Mr Charles Cowper, a patent agent, in England.  Following Mr Cowper's death in 1860 he continued his work as a patent attorney and later entered into partnership with John Imray, to form Abel & Imray in 1871 with offices in the Holborn area of London, a firm which still operates under that name today.

Abel assisted in founding the Chartered Institute of Patent Agents in 1882, and was the first "vice president" of the Chartered Institute.  and later served as President from 1897 to 1899.

He was elected a member of the Royal Society of Arts in 1886 and awarded the
Society’s Gold Medal for his paper on ‘The Patent Laws’ in 1904.

He died in 1906

References

External links
 
 Abel & Imray's current website
 Website of the Chartered Institute of Patent Attorneys

1906 deaths
1831 births
Patent attorneys
19th-century English lawyers